The AMIA bombing occurred on 18 July 1994 in Buenos Aires, Argentina, and targeted the Asociación Mutual Israelita Argentina (AMIA), a Jewish Community Centre. Executed as a suicidal attack, a bomb-laden van was driven into the AMIA building and subsequently detonated, killing 85 people and injuring over 300. To date, the bombing remains the deadliest terrorist attack in Argentine history. Argentina is home to a Jewish community of 230,000, making it the largest in Latin America and the sixth-largest in the world outside of Israel.

Over the years, the AMIA bombing has been marked by accusations of cover-ups. All suspects in the "local connection" (among them, many members of the Buenos Aires Provincial Police) were found to be not guilty in September 2004. In August 2005, federal judge Juan José Galeano, who was in charge of the case, was impeached and removed from his post on a charge of "serious irregularities" due to his mishandling of the investigation. In 2005, Catholic Church cardinal Jorge Mario Bergoglio, who would later become Pope Francis in 2013, was the first public personality to sign a petition for justice in the AMIA bombing case. He was one of the signatories on a document called "85 victims, 85 signatures" as part of the bombing's 11th anniversary.

On 25 October 2006, Argentine prosecutors Alberto Nisman and Marcelo Martínez Burgos formally accused the Iranian government of directing the bombing, and the Lebanese Islamist militant group Hezbollah of carrying it out. According to the prosecution's claims in 2006, Argentina had been targeted by Iran after Buenos Aires' decision to suspend a nuclear technology transfer contract to Tehran. This has been disputed as the contract was never terminated, and Iran and Argentina were negotiating on the restoration of full cooperation on all bilateral agreements from early 1992 until 1994, when the bombing occurred.

In 2015, Alberto Nisman filed a 300-page document accusing former Argentine president Cristina Fernández de Kirchner of covering up Iran's role in the incident. However, Nisman was murdered hours before he was due to testify against the former president, which the Federal Court of Buenos Aires ruled was a “direct consequence” of Nisman's accusations against Kirchner. In 2017, Argentine judge Claudio Bonadio accused Kirchner of treason and called on the Argentine Senate to permit her arrest and trial for allegedly covering up Iranian involvement in the 1994 attack. In 2021, the case against Kirchner was unanimously declared legally null and void by an Argentine federal court; the court found there to be no wrongdoing on Kirchner's part.

The 13th anniversary of the bombing was commemorated on 18 July 2007. In addition to nationwide exhibitions and ceremonies, radio and television stations and police cars all across Argentina sounded sirens at 9:53 a.m., which marked the time of the AMIA bombing. In 2019, Argentina officially designated Hezbollah as a terrorist organization.

Bombing
The exterior walls of this five story building were of brick masonry construction, which supported the floor slabs. The air blast from the bomb totally destroyed the exposed load-bearing walls which, in turn, led to progressive failure of the floor slabs and virtually total collapse of the building. Such bearing-wall buildings are notable for their tendency to be brought down in this manner by localized damage.

Other bombings
The bombing came two years after the 17 March 1992 bombing of the Israeli Embassy in Buenos Aires which killed 29 and wounded 242, and was Argentina's deadliest attack until the AMIA bombing. The Islamic Jihad Organization, which according to Robert Baer operates under the umbrella of Hezbollah and is linked to Iran, claimed responsibility for that bombing. It was suspected that the AMIA bombing was connected to the embassy attack. To date, authorities have been unable to locate those responsible for either of the two bombings.

The day after the AMIA attack, a suicide bombing on a Panamanian commuter plane killed all 21 passengers, 12 of whom were Jews. Investigators determined that the bombing was perpetrated by a "Lya Jamal" – thought to be "an Arab traveling under an alias, using fraudulently obtained Colombian documents."

Eight days after the AMIA attack, the Israeli embassy in London was car-bombed, and thirteen hours later a similar car bomb exploded outside a Jewish community centre in London. No one was killed but 22 were injured and "millions of pounds of damage" was done. Five Palestinians were later arrested in London and two convicted and sentenced to 20 years in prison in connection with the bombings.

Investigation and responsibility

In 2018 judicial authorities announced that former President Cristina Fernandez de Kirchner would face trial on charges she covered up the role of Iranians in bombing. Federal Judge Claudio Bonadio said that eleven other former officials and people close to Kirchner's government will also be tried on charges of cover-up and abuse of power. Kirchner has denied the charges.

No suspects have been convicted for the bombing and there have been a number of allegations made, with later investigations charging the government of Iran. The investigations were marred by incompetence. In 1999 an arrest warrant was issued against Hezbollah member Imad Mugniyah in connection with the attack. Argentine justice accused Tehran in 2006 of being behind the attacks, and indicted several senior Iranian officials, including Hashemi Rafsanjani and Ahmad Vahidi, as well as Hezbollah's Imad Mughniyah. In 2007, several of the charged were placed on Interpol's most wanted list; Interpol's bylaws prevented listing top officials such as Rafsanjani, however. As of 2017 the charged suspects (who remain alive) remain fugitives. In August 2021, two of the charged suspects, Ahmad Vahidi and Mohsen Rezai, were appointed to government of Ebrahim Raisi in the posts of interior minister and vice president of economic affairs, respectively.

Claim of responsibility
Shortly after the attack Ansar Allah, a Palestinian Jihadist organization widely held as a front for Hezbollah, reportedly claimed responsibility for the attack, and for the Alas Chiricanas Flight 901 bombing via leaflets distributed in Sidon and a communique in the Lebanese newspaper An-Nahar.

Ibrahim Hussein Berro
Israeli diplomatic sources who read the "final" report by SIDE on the attack said in 2003 that the attack was a suicide bombing carried out by Ibrahim Hussein Berro, a 21-year-old Hezbollah operative who has been honored with a plaque in southern Lebanon for his "martyrdom" on 18 July 1994, the date of the bombing. This investigation was carried out jointly with the U.S. Federal Bureau of Investigation. Hussein had been identified by FBI and Argentine intelligence, and corroborated by at least three witnesses. According to official Argentine government prosecutor, Alberto Nisman, Hussein's two US-based brothers had testified that he had joined the radical Shia militant group Hezbollah. "The brothers' testimony was substantial, rich in detail and showed that he was the one who was killed," Nisman added.

However, a BBC correspondent reported that "independent" investigators were skeptical, and they pointed out repeated incompetence and deception in the official investigation. No proper autopsies or DNA tests were done. The police had also simply dumped a head, thought to be that of the bomber, into a bin.

On 5 July 2017, The Algemeiner reported that DNA not assignable to any of the victims has been identified. This new evidence will allow investigators to test the prevailing suspicion that the bombing was committed by  Ibrahim Hussein Berro.

Juan José Galeano's investigations
Federal judge Juan José Galeano followed investigations concerning the "local connection", which included members of the Policía Bonaerense (Buenos Aires Provincial Police). He quickly arrested Carlos Telleldín, alleged to have provided the van used in the bombing, and some 20 officers from the Bonaerense. But a video broadcast on Argentine TV showed him offering Telleldín $400,000, in return for evidence, which led to Galeano's removal from the case in 2003, and his impeachment in August 2005.

Judge Galeano had also issued warrants for the arrests of 12 Iranians, including Hade Soleimanpour, Iran's ambassador to Argentina in 1994. The latter was arrested in the UK on 21 August 2003, at the request of the Argentine authorities. He was later released because, according to the Home Office, there was not even enough evidence presented to make a prima facie case for the extradition to proceed.

Judge Galeano also interviewed Abolghasem Mesbahi, aka "Witness C", an alleged former Iranian intelligence officer who reportedly said a former Argentine president accepted a $10 million payment from Tehran to block the investigation. Former President Carlos Menem denied the claims, but admitted he had a secret Swiss bank account following a report in The New York Times. Menem claimed in 2004 that the attack had been related to his support to the US during the First Gulf War and to his visit to Israel during his mandate. Abolghasem Mesbahi claimed to the Argentine court that Iran had planned the bombing, thinking the centre was a base for the Israeli secret service.

On 2 September 2004, all suspects in the "local connection" (among whom members of the Buenos Aires police) of AMIA case were found to be not guilty. Five persons, including four policemen, were therefore acquitted because of lack of evidence.

On 3 August 2005, Judge Galeano's impeachment was successful, and he was formally removed from his post as a federal judge for "serious" irregularities and his mishandling of the investigation. Argentine newspaper Clarín reports that charges will be pressed against him shortly. Judge Galeano has denied these allegations.

In March 2005, Swiss judge Jacques Antenen, in charge of investigations concerning the murder of an Iranian dissident, re-opened the case concerning Iranian intelligence service bank accounts in Switzerland. The same account would have been used both for this assassination and for the alleged payment of ex-President Carlos Menem. Swiss Justice had already been notified of the existence of an account owned by the Red Spark Foundation (based in Liechtenstein), in which Ramón Hernández, former secretary of Carlos Menem, had authority to sign documents. Six million dollars would have been deposited in this account, although in some moment the exact amount was said to be of $10 million.

In 2006, the Court of Cassation declared that the previous court had made a false version of the investigated acts in order to cover irresponsibilities.

Investigations under Néstor Kirchner's government
Néstor Kirchner's government issued a decree in July 2005 formally accepting a share of the blame for the failure of investigations about the attack. He called the unresolved investigations a "national disgrace.". President Kirchner said governments had covered up facts, and that the decree established a mechanism for victims to receive compensation. Shortly after assuming his functions in spring 2003, he opened up Argentine intelligence files on the case, and lifted a decree preventing SIDE agents from testifying in the case.

Argentina's justice, Israel, and the United States suspected in 2005 that Hezbollah was behind the attack, with backing from Iran. Hezbollah has denied responsibility. The Iranian government maintains its innocence, condemning the terrorist attack and calling for urgent punishment of those responsible.

On 25 October 2006, prosecutors in Buenos Aires formally charged Iran and Shi'a militia Hezbollah with the bombing, accusing the Iranian authorities of directing Hezbollah to carry out the attack and calling for the arrest of former President of Iran Ayatollah Hashemi Rafsanjani and seven others, including some who still hold official positions in Iran.

The Justice of Argentine called for the arrest of top Iranian authorities. The Iranian defense minister, Ahmad Vahidi was accused of masterminding the attack.

Argentine's government required the extradition of those accused of the attack but Iran has always refused to accept the verdict of the Argentine's Justice.

In November 2007, Interpol on behalf of the Argentine government, published the names of six individuals (Imad Mughniyah, Ali Fallahijan, Mohsen Rabbani, Ahmad Reza Asghari, Ahmad Vahidi and Mohsen Rezaee) officially accused for their role in the terrorist attack. They were entered in the Interpol red notice list.

Speaking on state radio, Iranian foreign ministry spokesman Mohammad Ali Hoseyni described the accusations against the country as "a Zionist plot". Both Hezbollah and Iran deny any involvement in the bombing. According to Hoseyni, the accusations were intended to divert "world attention from the perpetration of crimes by the Zionists against women and children in Palestine".

On 6 March 2007, former Congressman Mario Cafiero and former government official Luis D'Elia provided evidence at a press conference that Abolghasem Mesbahi, along with two other Iranians that gave alleged evidence implicating Iran in the bombing, were members of the People's Mujahedin of Iran (MEK), which is an organization that advocates the overthrow of the Islamic Republic of Iran and was designated until 2012 as a terrorist organization by the US. They also said that there were arrest warrants issued by Interpol for the other two Iranians, Hadi Roshanravani and Hamid Reza Eshagi.

Developments under Cristina Fernández de Kirchner's government

In November 2008, Carlos Menem was called to testify in an upcoming trial over the AMIA case.

In March 2009, a former investigator in the case, Claudio Lifschitz, claimed he was abducted and tortured by men who told him not to investigate SIDE's involvement in the case.

In August 2009, BBC News reported that Ahmad Vahidi had become Iran's defense minister-designate under the 2009 Mahmoud Ahmadinejad administration, and is on Interpol's wanted list over the AMIA bombing. Vahidi led a unit of Iran's Revolutionary Guard called Quds Force at the time of the attack, and has been accused of planning the bombings. Iran dismissed this development as a "Zionist plot". On 1 June 2011, Bolivia apologized to Argentina for Ahmad Vahidi's unannounced visit to the country, and announced that he would be leaving Bolivia immediately.

On 31 March 2012, Menem was ordered to stand trial for obstruction of justice in the probe of the AMIA bombing. Menem is accused of helping to cover up the tracks of local accomplices of the attackers.

In 2012, Argentina's President Cristina Fernández de Kirchner announced at the United Nations General Assembly that Iran and Argentina would meet to discuss Iranian involvement in the attacks. In 2014  she also criticized her country's Jewish leaders for not supporting Argentina's pact with Iran in order to jointly investigate the 1994 AMIA bombing attack:

My country is the only country of the Americas other than the United States of America that was the target of terrorist attacks: one in 1992 when the embassy of Israel was blown up, and the second in 1994 when the headquarters of the Asociación Mutual Israelita Argentina (AMIA) was bombed. This year marks the twentieth anniversary of the bombing of AMIA. I dare say before this Assembly—in the presence of some of the family members of the victims who have always been with us—that the Government headed by President Kirchner did the utmost and went the greatest lengths to uncover the real culprits, not only because it opened all my country's intelligence files and created a special prosecutor investigation unit, but also because, when in 2006 the justice system of my country accused Iranian citizens of involvement in the bombing of AMIA, I myself was the only President who dared to propose asking the Islamic Republic of Iran to cooperate with and assist in the investigation. That request was made intermittently from 2007 to 2011, until the Islamic Republic of Iran finally agreed to a bilateral meeting, allowing it to be included in the agenda. That meeting led to the signing by both countries of a memorandum of understanding on legal cooperation that allowed for the Iranian citizens who had been accused, and who live in Tehran, to be deposed before the judge. But what happened when we signed that memorandum? It seemed as if all hell had broken out, both nationally and internationally. The Jewish associations that had sought our support for so many years and that had come here with us to ask for help turned against us, and when an agreement was finally reached on legal cooperation they accused us of complicity with the State of Iran. The same thing happened here in the United States. When the vulture funds lobbied before the United States Congress, they accused us of collaborating with the Islamic Republic of Iran, which at the time was known as the Terrorist State of Iran. They even lobbied on their websites, posting pictures of me on the Internet with former President Ahmadinejad as if we were business partners. Just this week, we learned that the iconic Waldorf Astoria hotel, in this city, was the setting for a meeting between the Secretary of State of this country and his Iranian counterpart. We are not criticizing them. Quite the contrary, anything that represents dialogue and understanding seems very good to us. But we wish to ask those who have been accusing Iran of being a terrorist State.

Argentina's Foreign Minister Hector Timerman and Iranian Foreign Minister Ali Akbar Salehi met on the sidelines of the UN in New York and promised to continue talks until the 1990s bombings are resolved.

Memorandum of understanding

On 27 January 2013, the Government of Argentina announced it had signed a memorandum of understanding with Iran to establish a "truth commission" to investigate the AMIA bombing. According to President Kirchner, the commission was established to "analyze all the documentation presented to date by the judicial authorities of Argentina and Iran…and to give its vision and issue a report with recommendations about how the case should proceed within the legal and regulatory framework of both parties."
 
The news generated several criticisms with David Harris from the American Jewish Committee stating that "the idea of establishing a 'truth' commission on the AMIA tragedy that involves the Iranian regime would be like asking Nazi Germany to help establish the facts of Kristallnacht". The U.S. State Department's top official in charge of Latin American affairs, Assistant Secretary of State Roberta Jacobson, said she is "skeptical that a just solution can be found" through the Argentine-Iran "truth-commission." The Jewish community in Argentina issued the statement "to ignore everything that Argentine justice has done and to replace it with a commission that, in the best of cases, will issue, without any defined deadline, a 'recommendation' to the parties constitutes, without doubt, a reversal in the common objective of obtaining justice."

On 28 February 2013, the Argentine Chamber of Deputies approved the memorandum of understanding with Iran by 131 votes in favor to 113 votes against. Israel expressed disappointment at this development. Guillermo Borger, president of the AMIA, criticized the legality of the memorandum and announced that he would take it to the Supreme Court of Argentina.

In May 2014, the memorandum was declared unconstitutional by the Court. The memorandum was voided when Mauricio Macri became president of Argentina, as he withdrew the appeal that the Kirchners government had filed.

Recent developments

On 24 May 2013, it was reported that two of the Iranian AMIA bombing suspects accused of having planned the attack, Mohsen Rezai and Ali Akbar Velayati, were candidates for the Iranian presidential elections. In May 2013, Prosecutor Alberto Nisman published a 502-page indictment accusing Iran of establishing terrorist networks throughout Latin America – including in Argentina, Brazil, Paraguay, Uruguay, Chile, Colombia, Guyana, Trinidad and Tobago and Suriname – dating back to the 1980s. Nisman also said new evidence underscored the responsibility of Mohsen Rabbani, the former Iranian cultural attache in Argentina, as mastermind of the AMIA bombing and "coordinator of the Iranian infiltration of South America, especially in Guyana", and said US court documents showed Islamist militant Abdul Kadir – who was sentenced to life in prison in 2010 for participating in a foiled plan to attack John F. Kennedy International Airport in New York – was Rabbani's disciple.

The JTA reports that ex-interior minister of Argentina, Carlos Vladimir Corach, is to be investigated for his ties to the AMIA Jewish center bombing. He is alleged to have provided an illegal payment of $400,000 to Carlos Telleldin.

In an interview with Buenos Aires-based Jewish news agency (Agencia Judía de Noticias) on 2 January 2013, Itzhak Aviran, who was the Israeli ambassador to Argentina from 1993 to 2000, said most of the people behind the AMIA attack were eliminated by Israeli security agents operating abroad. Israeli Foreign Ministry spokesman Yigal Palmor called Aviran's declarations "complete nonsense".

In January 2015, the prosecutor in charge of the AMIA bombing investigation, Alberto Nisman, filed a 300-page complaint accusing President Cristina Fernández de Kirchner and Foreign Minister Héctor Timerman among other pro-government political figures of "covering up" Iranian citizens allegedly involved in the 1994 attack. Nisman said his accusations were based on phone taps on close political allies of Fernández, who he said conspired in a "sophisticated criminal plan" to negotiate with Rabbani himself, one of the main suspects of perpetrating the deadly bombing. According to the accusation, Iranian oil would be exchanged for Argentinian grain, while Argentina would cancel an international Interpol arrest warrant against Rabbani and other senior Iranian officials. Nisman demanded a preventive embargo of 200 million pesos on Fernández de Kirchner and requested to question her, as well as Timerman, lawmaker of the pro-government organization "La Cámpora" Andrés Larroque, political leader Luis D'Elía, the leader of Quebracho Fernando Esteche, members of Secretariat of Intelligence, the leader of the Iranian community in Argentina Jorge "Yussuf" Khali, and ex attorney and judge Héctor Yrimia. On 18 January 2015, Nisman was found dead at his home in Buenos Aires, hours before he was due to explain his allegations at the Argentine parliament. A gun and spent shell casing were found next to the body, and a government official said the death was likely a suicide although others considered the death suspicious. The judge Ariel Lijo returned immediately from his vacations to work in the case, and to order the protection of Nisman's proofs. Nisman was replaced by prosecutor Alberto Gentili.

In the week following Nisman's death, and despite the fact that Nisman was going to implicate her among others had he lived, President Fernández de Kirchner declared her determination to replace the Argentinian secret security service completely because it had been run beyond the state's control for too long.

In March 2015, three former Venezuelan government officials interviewed by Veja stated that Hugo Chávez and Mahmoud Ahmadinejad allegedly met in 2007 to discuss payments to the Argentine government of Cristina Fernández de Kirchner in order for Iran to receive Argentine nuclear technology and the cessation of work between Argentina and Interpol involving Iranian individuals.

In March 2015, the Argentine government released a full-page advertisement in national newspapers accusing the late prosecutor Alberto Nisman of having attempted to destabilise the country. The advertisement also argued that the country should revive a controversial agreement with Iran, the country that is suspected of being responsible for the bombings. In addition to that, during a speech, President Cristina Fernández de Kirchner accused Israel of being responsible for the 1992 bombing of the Israeli embassy in Argentina. This accusation was based on the allegation that Israel was only demanding justice for the AMIA bombing but not for the embassy attack. This was immediately refuted by the Israeli embassy, which reaffirmed that it does in fact demand justice for both cases.

In December 2015, Radio Mitre, an Argentinean station, released secret tapes of Héctor Timerman, in which he admitted Iran was responsible for the bombings concurrent to negotiating with Iran.

On 26 February 2016, the Argentine prosecutor Ricardo Sáenz stated Nisman's death "was a homicide indeed", claiming the case should be directed to the federal justice.

On 18 July 2019, at the request of Israel and the United States, Argentina officially declared Hezbollah a terrorist organization, freezing assets and expelling all members of the organization from the country, which is held responsible for the 1994 attack against AMIA.

In 2021, the Tribunal Federal Oral 8 declared the case against Cristina Fernández de Kirchner over an alleged cover-up of Iranian involvement in the bombing to be null and void; the court unanimously found there to have been no wrongdoing on Kirchner's part.

Alleged assassinations of perpetrators
In January 2014, Yitzhak Aviran, who had been Israel's ambassador to Argentina at the time, claimed in an interview with a Spanish-language Jewish newspaper that most of the perpetrators of the attack had been tracked down and killed by Mossad, Israel's secret service, saying "a majority of those responsible for the act are no longer alive, and we took care of this on our own."  Aviran's statements caused concern in Argentina, whose Foreign Minister, Héctor Timerman, accused Israel of having thus "prevented the gathering of new evidence that could shed light on the affair." Argentina also summoned the Israeli chargé d'affaires to ask for explanations about Aviran's statements. For its part, the Israeli government, through its own Foreign Ministry, dismissed Aviran's claims as "complete nonsense."

Other opinions
According to a report in The Nation, the author claims that James Cheek, United States Ambassador to Argentina at the time of the bombing, told him, "To my knowledge, there was never any real evidence [of Iranian responsibility]. They never came up with anything." The hottest lead in the case, he recalled, was an Iranian defector named Manoucher Moatamer, who "supposedly had all this information." But Moatamer turned out to be only a dissatisfied low-ranking official without the knowledge of government decision-making that he had claimed. "We finally decided that he wasn't credible," Cheek recalled.

Cultural depictions

Ten years after the terrorist attack, a group of 10 Argentine directors, each financed by a different production company, filmed a collection of 10 shorts in tribute to the victims of the attack. The shorts were collected in the film 18-j, dubbed thus in reference to the date of the attack. The directors were Daniel Burman, Israel Adrián Caetano, Lucía Cedrón, Alejandro Doria, Alberto Lecchi, Sergio Renán, Marcelo Schapces, Carlos Sorín, Juan Bautista Stagnaro, Adrián Suar and Mauricio Wainrot; a small introduction was narrated by actress Norma Aleandro. Each short showed a different scene in the lives of those who witnessed the attack first-hand. The film premiered 19 August 2004.

In 2009, Marcos Carnevale directed Anita, a full-length film which portrays a young woman (Alejandra Manzo) with Down Syndrome who is lost in Buenos Aires after her mother is killed in the AMIA bombing.

See also

 Israeli embassy attack in Buenos Aires
 History of the Jews in Argentina
 Argentina–Israel relations
 Pasteur - AMIA (Buenos Aires Underground) – station commemorating the bombing

References

External links

 Investigations Unit of the Office of the Attorney General, 25 October 2006, indictment for AMIA bombing, English translation
Formula Denuncia, Ministerio Público de la Nación (Spanish) – Nisman's formal charge of  impeding the investigation against the President and Foreign Minister, archive
AMIA Case – Assessment of Argentine explosions, developments on AMIA dossier Iran's view from IRNA
BBC: Pressure on Iran over Argentina blasts

"Argentine bomb police 'to testify'"; 17 September 2003; BBC News
"Flashback: Argentina bomb"; 25 August 2003; BBC News
"Iran denies Argentina blast role"; 9 March 2003; BBC News
Pictures from the tenth anniversary commemoration
Memoria Activa, memorial site  (including official documents)

1994 in international relations
1990s in Buenos Aires
1994 murders in Argentina
20th-century attacks on synagogues and Jewish communal organizations
20th-century mass murder in South America
Antisemitism in Argentina
Attacks on buildings and structures in 1994
Building bombings in South America
Crime in Buenos Aires
Improvised explosive device bombings in 1994
Islamic terrorism in Argentina
Islamic terrorist incidents in 1994
Argentina–Iran relations
Argentina–Israel relations
Iran–Israel proxy conflict
Hezbollah–Israel conflict
Jewish Argentine history
Jews and Judaism in Buenos Aires
July 1994 crimes
July 1994 events in South America
Mass murder in 1994
Presidency of Carlos Menem
South Lebanon conflict (1985–2000)
State-sponsored terrorism
Suicide bombings in 1994
Suicide car and truck bombings in Argentina
Terrorist incidents by unknown perpetrators
Terrorist incidents in Argentina in the 1990s
Terrorist incidents in South America in 1994
Unsolved mass murders
Hezbollah attacks